Where There Is Life is an album by Luciano.

The album was listed in the 1999 book The Rough Guide: Reggae: 100 Essential CDs.

Personnel
Engineer: Robert Murphy; Paul Daley
Guest Artists: Terror Fabulous; Louie Culture; Dean Fraser; Sly Dunbar; Robbie Shakespeare

Track listing
 It's Me Again Jah
 Lord Give Me Strength
 Who Could It Be
 He Is My Friend
 Your World And Mine
 Just Like The Wind
 He
 Good God
 There's No Love In The World
 Where There Is Life
 Heaven Help Us All
 In This Together (with Louie Culture/Terror Fabulous)

References

1995 albums
Luciano (singer) albums